Primary Information is a Brooklyn-based non-profit organization that publishes artist books, artists’ writings, re-publishes out-of-print art publications and limited art editions.

History 
Formed in 2006, Primary Information was created to foster inter-generational dialogue through the publication of artists’ books and writings by artists. The organization’s period of focus is from the early-1960s to the present, with an emphasis on conceptual art and post-conceptual art practice.

Funding 
Primary Information receives support through grants from The Andy Warhol Foundation for the Visual Arts, The National Endowment for the Arts and other organizations and individuals.

See also 
 List of book arts centers
 NY Art Book Fair
 Artist's book

Footnotes

External links 
 Primary Information home page 
 
Publishing companies of the United States
American artist groups and collectives
Non-profit organizations based in New York (state)
Companies based in New York City
Organizations based in Brooklyn
2006 establishments in New York City